This is an incomplete list of whisky distilleries in Scotland. According to the Scotch Whisky Association there were 143 distilleries licensed to produce Scotch whisky as of March 2023.

Currently operating distilleries

Malt whisky distilleries

Grain whisky distilleries

Closed distilleries

Former malt distilleries

Former grain distilleries

See also

 Scotch whisky
 List of historic whisky distilleries
 List of whisky brands
 Outline of whisky

References

Further reading

External links
 Scottish Whisky: Distilleries (Details of distilleries open to the public)
 http://www.dcs.ed.ac.uk/home/jhb/whisky/pronounc.html (pronunciation, incl. audio, of distilleries)
 http://www.maltwhiskydistilleries.com/ (information about Pernod Ricard's Speyside distilleries)
 http://www.planetwhiskies.com/distilleries/scottishpagea.html (Planet Whiskies has a nearly a full list of Scottish Whisky Distilleries, but also a list of distilleries from American, Australia, Canada to only name a few...)
 https://scotchwhisky.com/whiskypedia/distilleries-brands/?ct=2

Scotland
 
 
Economy of Scotland
 Distilleries in Scotland, List